Larisa Mikhaylovna Savkina (born 8 February 1955) is a retired Soviet handball player. She was born in Georgia to Russian parents, but played in Azerbaijan for Automobilist Baku. She was part of the Soviet team that won a gold medal at the 1980 Olympics in Moscow. She played all five matches and scored one goal.

References

1955 births
Living people
Soviet female handball players
Azerbaijani female handball players
Handball players at the 1980 Summer Olympics
Olympic handball players of the Soviet Union
Olympic gold medalists for the Soviet Union
Olympic medalists in handball
Medalists at the 1980 Summer Olympics